Ante Vitaić (born 7 June 1982) is a Croatian coach and former player who most recently coached NK Omiš.

Playing career
Hailing from Dugi Rat Ante, along with his identical twin brother Frane went through the ranks of HNK Hajduk Split before being sent out on loan to NK Mosor where they would remain for the following four years. A good start of the 2004/2005 season in the Druga HNL side, when he scored 7 goals in 16 matches got him a new contract with Hajduk and he rejoined the first team. Vitaić made his debut in the 1–0 away cup loss against NK Zagreb, which would prove to be his only cap for the club. Not wishing to be loaned back to Druga HNL, the brothers annulled their contracts and joined NK Osijek.

Vitaić spent the following three years in Osijek, the highlight of his career being his goal from distance in the last, 95th minute of the 1–0 win against his former club in 2006.

In 2008 Vitaić joined the Norwegian side HamKam, but returned to Croatia after the club was relegated. He joined RNK Split, then in Treća HNL, achieving back to back promotions with them, first to Druga HNL, and then, in 2010 to Prva HNL, remaining a fixture in the club in the following seasons as well. He scored Split's second ever goal in European competition against Slovenian side Domžale in the 2011–12 Europa League.

Managerial career
Vitaić was manager of Orkan Dugi Rat in the second half of the 2015–16 season and took charge of Zmaj Makarska in summer 2017.
He became coach of Omiš in 2019 and head of the Solin footballe academu in summer 2020.
In summer 2021, he left Solin to take charge of the Primorac Stobreč juniors.

References

External links
 

1982 births
Living people
Footballers from Split, Croatia
Croatian twins
Twin sportspeople
Association football midfielders
Croatian footballers
Croatian Football League players
Eliteserien players
First Football League (Croatia) players
Second Football League (Croatia) players
HNK Hajduk Split players
NK Mosor players
NK Osijek players
Hamarkameratene players
RNK Split players
NK Dugopolje players
Croatian football managers
Croatian expatriate footballers
Croatian expatriate sportspeople in Norway
Expatriate footballers in Norway